Quảng Trị Airport (Vietnamese language: Sân bay Quảng Trị) is a military/civil planned to be constructed in the province of Quảng Trị, Vietnam, around 560 km south of Hanoi.
The airport will be located in the commune of Gio Quang,  Gio Linh District, 7 km north of the provincial capital Đông Hà. The master plan was signed by the chairman of the Quảng Trị provincial people's committee. The investment cost is estimated VND 374.787 billion (equivalent to US$27 million). The airport is expected to be operational from 2015. The airport will cover 290 hectares, 93 km south of Quảng Bình Province's Đồng Hới Airport and 88 km north Phu Bai International Airport by road (National Route 1).

Notes

External links
Quang Tri to have deep-water port

Airports in Vietnam
Buildings and structures in Quảng Trị province
Proposed airports in Vietnam